The 2018 CAF Confederation Cup (officially the 2018 Total CAF Confederation Cup for sponsorship reasons) was the 15th edition  of Africa's secondary club football tournament organized by the Confederation of African Football (CAF), under the current CAF Confederation Cup title after the merger of CAF Cup and African Cup Winners' Cup.

Raja Casablanca won the title for the first time, defeating AS Vita Club in the final, and earned the right to play against the winners of the 2018 CAF Champions League in the 2019 CAF Super Cup.

TP Mazembe were the two-time defending champions, but as they qualified for the 2018 CAF Champions League and reached the group stage, they were not able to defend their title.

Association team allocation
All 56 CAF member associations may enter the CAF Confederation Cup, with the 12 highest ranked associations according to their CAF 5-Year Ranking eligible to enter two teams in the competition. As a result, theoretically a maximum of 68 teams could enter the tournament (plus 16 teams eliminated from the CAF Champions League which enter the play-off round) – although this level has never been reached.

For the 2018 CAF Confederation Cup, the CAF uses the 2012–2016 CAF 5-Year Ranking, which calculates points for each entrant association based on their clubs’ performance over those 5 years in the CAF Champions League and CAF Confederation Cup. The criteria for points are the following:

The points are multiplied by a coefficient according to the year as follows:
2016 – 5
2015 – 4
2014 – 3
2013 – 2
2012 – 1

Teams
The following 54 teams from 42 associations entered the competition.
Teams in bold received a bye to the first round.
The other teams entered the preliminary round.

Associations are shown according to their 2012–2016 CAF 5-Year Ranking – those with a ranking score have their rank and score indicated.

Notes

A further 16 teams eliminated from the 2018 CAF Champions League entered the play-off round.

Associations which did not enter a team

 Cape Verde
 Central African Republic
 Chad
 Eritrea
 Guinea-Bissau
 Lesotho
 Namibia
 Réunion
 São Tomé and Príncipe
 Sierra Leone
 Somalia
 Togo
 Uganda
 Zimbabwe

Schedule
The schedule of the competition was as follows (matches scheduled in midweek in italics). The regulations were modified with an additional draw before the quarter-finals. Effective from the Confederation Cup group stage, weekend matches were played on Sundays while midweek matches were played on Wednesdays, with some exceptions. Kick-off times were also fixed at 13:00, 16:00 and 19:00 GMT.

Qualifying rounds

Preliminary round

First round

Play-off round

Group stage

In the group stage, each group was played on a home-and-away round-robin basis. The winners and runners-up of each group advanced to the quarter-finals of the knockout stage.

Group A

Group B

Group C

Group D

Knockout stage

Bracket

Quarter-finals

Semi-finals

Final

Top goalscorers

See also
2018 CAF Champions League
2019 CAF Super Cup

References

External links
Total CAF Confederation Cup 2018, CAFonline.com

 
2018
2